Brzozów may refer to the following places:
Brzozów, Łowicz County in Łódź Voivodeship (central Poland)
Brzozów, Skierniewice County in Łódź Voivodeship (central Poland)
Brzozów in Subcarpathian Voivodeship (south-east Poland)
Brzozów, Tomaszów Mazowiecki County in Łódź Voivodeship (central Poland)
Brzozów, Siedlce County in Masovian Voivodeship (east-central Poland)
Brzozów, Sokołów County in Masovian Voivodeship (east-central Poland)
Brzozów, Lubusz Voivodeship (west Poland)

See also